The county of Dorset is divided into eight districts. The districts of Dorset are Weymouth and Portland, West Dorset, North Dorset, Purbeck, East Dorset, Christchurch, and the unitary authorities Bournemouth and Poole.

As there are 508 Grade II* listed buildings in the county they have been split into separate lists for each district.

 Grade II* listed buildings in Bournemouth
 Grade II* listed buildings in Christchurch
 Grade II* listed buildings in East Dorset
 Grade II* listed buildings in North Dorset
 Grade II* listed buildings in Poole (borough)
 Grade II* listed buildings in Purbeck (district)
 Grade II* listed buildings in West Dorset
 Grade II* listed buildings in Weymouth and Portland

See also
 Grade I listed buildings in Dorset
Grade II listed buildings in Dorset
 :Category:Grade II* listed buildings in Dorset

References
National Heritage List for England

 
 
Lists of listed buildings in Dorset